Charlotte McDonald-Gibson is a British journalist, editor, and author. Her first book Cast Away was published in 2016, her second book Far Out was published in 2022.

Career 
McDonald-Gibson is a journalist whose career has included five years of work reporting on the European migrant crisis. She has worked an editor for Time Magazine and has been a finalist for the Helen Bernstein Book Award for Excellence in Journalism. She has also written for The New York Times and Monocle magazine.

Publications 
McDonald-Gibson is the author of the 2016 non-fiction book Cast Away, that retells the story of five refugee's escape to Europe. The book was described by Princess Haya bint Hussein as "honest and heartfelt".

She is also the author of the 2022 non fiction book Far Out: Encounters with Extremists, published by Granta Books.

Personal life 
In 2017, she was based in Brussels and more recently lived in The Hague.

References

External links 
 Official website

Year of birth missing (living people)
Time (magazine) people
21st-century British women writers
British editors
British emigrants to Belgium
British emigrants to the Netherlands
The New York Times people
Living people